Pyay Township or Prome Township  is a township in Pyay District in the Bago Region of Burma. The principal town is Pyay.

References

Townships of the Bago Region
Pyay District